Islabikes is a manufacturer of bicycles based near Ludlow in Shropshire, England. Originally known for children's bikes, since 2019 the company has also produced bicycles aimed at the over 65s. It was founded in 2006 by competitive cyclist Isla Rowntree, the name Islabikes derived from her first name, initially located at Claverley in east Shropshire until it moved to Bromfield, Shropshire in 2010. In November 2014 the company employed 40 people.

Islabikes is known to produce very light bikes where all components are designed specifically for the intended rider. In 2011 Islabikes introduced its first adult-sized model, the Beinn 29 . Islabikes opened a North American headquarters in Portland, Oregon and began sales in April, 2013, but pulled out of the US market in 2018 due to uncertainty over Brexit and US regulations. The bicycles are designed in the UK and manufactured in Vietnam.

In February 2022, Islabikes announced the production of two new models for riders with dwarfism.

References

External links
 

Cycle manufacturers of the United Kingdom
Vehicle manufacturing companies established in 2005
Companies based in Shropshire
Ludlow